Tokushige (written: 徳重) is a Japanese surname. Notable people with the surname include:

, Japanese footballer
, Japanese footballer

See also
Farrington v. Tokushige, United States Supreme Court case
, underground metro station in Midori-ku, Nagoya, Aichi Prefecture, Japan

Japanese-language surnames